WILC-CD (channel 8) is a low-power, Class A television station licensed to Sugar Grove, Illinois, United States, serving the Chicago area and primarily airing paid programming. It is owned by Venture Technologies Group alongside WRME-LD (channel 33) and Oswego-licensed WAOE (channel 59). WILC-CD's transmitter is located atop the John Hancock Center.

History
Waubonsee Community College, which serves the Aurora area, launched the station on channel 54 as W54BE. Programming included distance education telecourses from the college and a community bulletin board. The station moved to channel 40 in 2008, with the call sign W40CN. The college marketed the station as primarily on cable: Comcast channel 99 or 17; Mediacom channel 15; or AT&T U-Verse channel 99.

The college was not able to construct a digital facility for the station, citing severe budget problems with Illinois state funding and the local district's real estate tax base as reasons. In April 2012, the college filed to sell W40CN to Local Media TV Holdings.

On November 24, 2020, the station moved to digital channel 27, as W27EB-D. On October 24, 2022, the station changed its call sign to WILC-CD.

Subchannels

References

External links
Waubonsee Community College telecourses
Watching Waubonsee's Educational Television Channel

Low-power television stations in the United States
Sugar Grove, Illinois
Kane County, Illinois
ILC-CD
Television channels and stations established in 1992
1992 establishments in Illinois